Secrets of Monte Carlo is a 1951 American crime film directed by George Blair and starring Warren Douglas, Lois Hall and June Vincent.

Plot
In Hong Kong, a British insurance investigator and an American businessman join forces to recover the jewels of a Rajah which had recently been stolen by a gang on the French Riviera.

Cast

Critical reception
TV Guide called the film a "competent programmer"; while Allmovie noted, "though inexpensively produced, Secrets of Monte Carlo is an effective suspenser, with Republic's back lot standing in admirably as Southern Europe. Another plus: a formidable array of villains, headed by the glamorous June Vincent."

References

Bibliography
 Fetrow, Alan G. Feature films, 1950-1959: a United States filmography. McFarland & Company, 1999.

External links

1951 films
American crime films
American black-and-white films
1951 crime films
Films directed by George Blair
Republic Pictures films
Films set in Monaco
Films set in Hong Kong
1950s English-language films
1950s American films